The ship Mare Jonio was originally constructed as a tugboat in 1972. Operating on behalf of Mediterranea Saving Humans (MSH), Mare Jonio has been active in a Search and Rescue (SAR) role rescuing shipwrecked refugees in the Mediterranean Sea since October 2018. The project also has the support of the German association Sea-Watch and the Spanish Proactiva Open Arms. The ship is owned by  through Idra Social Shipping SRL and is managed by Augustea Imprese Marittime e di Salvataggi SpA of Genoa, Italy; Mare Jonio sails under the Italian flag.

Specifications
Mare Jonio is 37m long (some sources give 38m, more specifically 37.55m in one source), with a beam of 9m and a draught of 3.2m. The ship has a maximum speed of 13knots.

Earlier history

Between 2007 and 2018 the ship operated largely on the western side of Italy.

SAR history: Selected events

2018
Mare Jonio began SAR operations by setting sail on 3 October 2018.

2019
Mare Jonio was seized by the Italian authorities in September 2019 over a dispute regarding the legality of landing shipwrecked refugees at Italian ports. The ship remained confiscated until February 2020, when a jury accepted Mediterranea's appeal, immediately releasing the ship from seizure.

2020
During March 2020 MSH announced that its two ships, Mare Jonio and Alex would suspend their navigation due to the COVID-19 pandemic. Operations resumed in June 2020, and sixty people were rescued on 19 June, followed by another forty-three on 29 June.

The ship was declared to be subject to mandatory maintenance work and has been in the port of Chioggia, Italy, since November 2020.

Awards
The Mare Jonio together with the Maersk Etienne were given the "Seafarers’ Award" 2021 at Copenhagen.

References 

European migrant crisis
Immigrant rights activism
Humanitarian aid organizations in Europe
Refugee aid organizations in Europe